Enosmaeus cubanus is a species of beetle in the family Cerambycidae, the only species in the genus Enosmaeus.

References

Achrysonini